Kattel is a surname belonging to the Khas people of either Upadhya or the Jaishi Bahun caste from Nepal. The Jaisi sometimes write Jammarkattel.

Notable people with the surname Kattel include:
Rishi Kattel,  Nepali politician
Sitaram Kattel, Nepalese actor

In Estonia
Rainer Kattel, Estonian academic and science administrator

Fictional Usage
Basudev Kattel, Main protagonist from novel Kattel Sarko Chotpatak (translation: Kattel Sir's Injuries)

References

Ethnic groups in Nepal
Nepali-language surnames
Khas surnames
Brahmin communities